Hyperolius acuticephalus is a species of frog in the family Hyperoliidae. Being only known from its type locality, Ngoto in southwestern Central African Republic, it is endemic to that country. However, the exact type locality is considered untraceable. There are doubts about taxonomic validity of this species, to the degree that the AmphibiaWeb considers it a nomen nudum.

There is no information on ecology of or threats to this species.

References

acuticephalus
Frogs of Africa
Amphibians of the Central African Republic
Endemic fauna of the Central African Republic
Amphibians described in 1931
Taxa named by Ernst Ahl
Taxonomy articles created by Polbot